The Victoria Daly Regional Council is a local government area in the Northern Territory of Australia.

History
In October 2006 the Northern Territory Government announced the reform of local government areas. The intention of the reform was to improve and expand the delivery of services to towns and communities across the Northern Territory by establishing eleven new shires. The Victoria Daly Shire was created on 1 July 2008 as were the remaining ten shires. The first election for the Shire was held on 25 October 2008.

The Shire became the Victoria Daly Region on 1 January 2014.

Most of the land now part of the Region used to be unincorporated, but several existing LGAs were merged into it:
 Daguragu Community
 Nauiyu Nambiyu Community
 Timber Creek Community
 Walangeri Ngumpinku Community
 Pine Creek Community
 Woolianna Community

On 1 July 2014, the  boundaries on its west side were revised to create a new local government area  called the West Daly Region  which consisted of the following three wards from the Victoria Daly Region - Nganmarriyanga, Thamarrurr/Pindi Pindi and Tyemirri.

A general election was held in September 2017. Councillor Brian Pedwell was elected Mayor of Victoria Daly Regional Council.

Wards
The Victoria Daly Regional Council is divided into 5 wards, which is governed by 5 councillors:
 Pine Creek  (1)
 Milngin (1)
 Timber Creek (1)
 Walangeri (1)
 Daguragu (1)

Localities and communities
Land within the Victoria Daly Shire was divided in 2007 into bounded areas for the purpose of creating an address for a property.  Most  bounded areas are called "localities" while those associated with aboriginal communities are called "communities".

Localities
Baines    
Bradshaw     
Buchanan     
Burrundie     	
Claravale     	
Daly River     	
Delamere    	
Douglas-Daly (part)  
Edith     		
Fleming   	
Gregory    	
Gurindji (part) 	
Maranunga    	
Nemarluk    (part)
Pine Creek    	
Timber Creek    
Tipperary   	
Top Springs   	
Victoria River

Communities
Daguragu	
Kalkarindji	
Nauiyu     	
Pigeon Hole    
Yarralin

Notes

References

External links
Victoria Daly Region website
Map of LGAs
Policy details

 
Local government areas of the Northern Territory